John Sigismund Tanner (1705 – 14 March 1775) was an engraver of the Kingdom of Great Britain, making dies for coins and medals.

Tanner, a native of Saxe-Coburg, worked mostly for the Royal Mint at the Tower of London and was its Chief Engraver from 1741.  He remained at the mint until his death in 1775 although took little part in preparing the new dies, as during his latter years he suffered from approaching blindness and many other infirmities.  Most of the work carried out during Tanner's latter years was carried out by his chief assistant Richard Yeo, who succeeded to the post of Chief Engraver upon Tanner's death.  Tanner designed a sixpence for the Royal Mint during the reign of King George II, the coin became popularly known as the "tanner" and this appellation preserved until decimalisation in 1971.

Life

In 1729, the Master of the Mint admitted, with some apprehension, that John Croker, Chief Engraver to the Mint since 1705, was then "the only man now living who has hitherto made Puncheons for the Head on the Coin" and recommended the appointment of an assistant in the shape of Tanner, then aged only 24. When Croker died on 21 March 1741, Tanner succeeded him. After 1739 he engraved most of the dies for the coins of George II and George III.

Tanner died on 14 March 1775, after retiring from the Mint.

Notes

1700s births
1775 deaths
18th-century engravers
Artists from Dresden
English engravers
German emigrants to the Kingdom of Great Britain